Heinz Ollesch  (born November 27, 1966) is a strongman from Germany. He won Germany's Strongest Man 12 times, and participated in the World's Strongest Man finals in 1995 and 1997.

Biography 
Ollesch was born in Rosenheim, Bavaria and grew up in Lehen, Großkarolinenfeld, starting with strength training 1984 and doing international Strongman contests since 1994. In the same year he was invited to the World's Strongest Man for the first time but did not make it past the qualifying heats. In 1994 he also became Germany's Strongest Man for the first time, a feat he would repeat to 2004.  A year later he was invited again and made it to the final where he finished fourth, his best result at the World's Strongest Man. He would participate for several more years in the tournament but only managed to reach the final again in 1996 where he would finish sixth. The same year he finished second in Europe's Strongest Man. In 2006 he was Germany's Strongest Man for the last time. He managed a podium finish on three occasions at the World Strongman Challenge, third in 1995 and second in 1997 and 2000. He also played a supporting role in the Thai movie Tom-Yum-Goong.

Honours
12 times Germany’s Strongest Man (1994–2004 and 2006)
4th place World's Strongest Man (1995)
6th place World's Strongest Man (1997)

References

External links
 Personal website

1966 births
Living people
German strength athletes
Sportspeople from Upper Bavaria
People from Rosenheim